Heberto Castillo Martínez (August 23, 1928 – April 5, 1997) was a Mexican civil engineer and political activist.

Castillo was born in Ixhuatlán de Madero, Veracruz, and received a bachelor's degree in civil engineering from the National Autonomous University. An accomplished engineer, he taught several courses at the UNAM and at the National Polytechnic Institute, wrote several textbooks and invented the tridilosa.

He became a political activist and got involved in several workers' rights struggles, leading to imprisonment by the federal government in the infamous Lecumberri Penitentiary. Castillo was one of the first among leading left-wing politicians to express dismay at the dictatorial nature of Soviet-bloc governments, starting a movement towards a social democracy-based left wing and away from a Moscow-based left leaning opposition in Mexico.

During his lifetime he co-founded three political parties: the Mexican Workers' Party (Partido Mexicano de los Trabajadores, PMT), the Mexican Socialist Party (Partido Mexicano Socialista, PMS) and the Party of the Democratic Revolution (Partido de la Revolución Democrática, PRD). In his last years in politics he became a staunch critic of the Zapatista rebellion in Chiapas and, crucially, voluntarily withdrew from the presidential race in 1988 to support the unified candidacy of Cuauhtémoc Cárdenas.

He died on April 5, 1997 in Mexico City and received the Belisario Domínguez Medal of Honor (postmortem) that same year.

References

External links
 The Heberto Castillo Foundation

1928 births
1997 deaths
Members of the Senate of the Republic (Mexico)
Party of the Democratic Revolution politicians
Mexican democracy activists
Mexican civil engineers
National Autonomous University of Mexico alumni
Academic staff of the Instituto Politécnico Nacional
Recipients of the Belisario Domínguez Medal of Honor
Mexican inventors
People from Veracruz
Socialist Mexican Party politicians
Mexican Workers' Party politicians
Science and technology in Mexico